Rafael Mamprin Losano (born 10 October 1997) is a Brazilian equestrian. He competed in the individual eventing at the 2020 Summer Olympics.

References

External links
 

1997 births
Living people
Brazilian male equestrians
Olympic equestrians of Brazil
Equestrians at the 2020 Summer Olympics
Place of birth missing (living people)
Event riders
Pan American Games medalists in equestrian
Pan American Games silver medalists for Brazil
Medalists at the 2019 Pan American Games
Equestrians at the 2019 Pan American Games
21st-century Brazilian people
People from Rio Claro, São Paulo